Adipomastia, also known colloquially as fatty breasts, is a condition defined as an excess of skin and/or a flat layer of adipose tissue (that doesn't protude like female breasts) in the breasts without true gynecomastia. It is commonly present in men with obesity, and is particularly apparent in men who have undergone massive weight loss. A related/synonymous term is pseudogynecomastia. The condition is different and should be distinguished from gynecomastia ("women's breasts"), which involves female-like protruding fat tissue and/or glandular tissue in a male. The two conditions can usually be distinguished easily by palpation to check for the presence of glandular tissue. Another difference between the conditions is that breast pain/tenderness does not occur in pseudogynecomastia. Sometimes, gynecomastia and pseudogynecomastia are present together; this is related to the fact that fat tissue expresses aromatase, the enzyme responsible for the synthesis of estrogen, and estrogen is produced to a disproportionate extent in men with excessive amounts of fat, resulting in simultaneous glandular enlargement.

References

External links 

Breast diseases
Medical conditions related to obesity